Sagisu (also Sagishu) was a king (Malikum) of the first Eblaite kingdom ruling c. 2680 BC. The king's name is translated as "DN has killed".

Eblaites practiced the worship of deceased kings; the cult of Sagisu was maintained in Ebla and was of importance during the enthronement of new kings. Offerings were presented to Sagisu during the coronation festivals of kings Irkab-Damu and Isar-Damu; this prove the continuity of the royal family of Ebla.

Notes

Citations

27th-century BC rulers
Kings of Ebla
Deified people
27th-century BC people